Lohgarh is a medium size village in the Phillaur tehsil administrative region of Jalandhar District of Punjab State, India. The village is administrated by a sarpanch who is an elected representative of the village as per the Panchayati raj (India) local government system.

Caste 
The village has population of 770 and in the village most of the villagers are from schedule caste (SC) which has constitutes 51.30% of total population of the village and it doesn't have any Schedule Tribe (ST) population.

Education 
The village has a Punjabi Medium, Co-educational primary school (Pri Lohgarh School). The school provides a mid-day meal and it was founded in 1954. The nearest government high school is located in Apra.

Transport

Rail 

Air 
The other nearest international airport is located in Chandigarh.

References 

Villages in Jalandhar district
Villages in Phillaur tehsil